The Jóźwin coal mine is a large mine in the west of Poland in Jóźwin, Greater Poland Voivodeship, 150 km west of the capital, Warsaw. Jóźwin represents one of the largest coal reserve in Poland having estimated reserves of 96.3 million tonnes of coal. The annual coal production is around 3.3 million tonnes.

References

External links 
 Official site

Coal mines in Poland
Coal mines in Greater Poland Voivodeship